Tennis Gold Coast is the governing body for the sport of tennis in the Gold Coast, Queensland. The organisation is based in Southport, Queensland in Australia. Famous players from the Gold Coast are players such as Samantha Stosur and Bernard Tomic.

Affiliations
Tennis Gold Coast is affiliated with the following organisations: 
Tennis Queensland
Tennis Australia

Affiliated Clubs/Centres
Queens Park Tennis Centre
Bueleigh Heads Tennis Club
Currumbin Tennis Club 
Gold Coast Albert Junior Tennis Club
Discovery Park Tennis Club
Emerald Lakes Tennis Centre
Pat Cash International Tennis Academy
Island Tennis Club
International Tennis Academy GC
Jacobs Well & District Tennis Assoc
Labrador Tennis Club
Miami Tennis Club
Mudgeeraba Tennis Club
Nerang Tennis Club
Ormeau/Pimpama Tennis Club
Pimpama Island Sports Assoc. Inc
Pro-one Tennis Academy 
Radisson Resort 
Robina Woods Tennis/Golf Club 
Royal Pines Tennis Centre
Somerset Tennis
Sports Mirage
Tallara Tennis Club
Tambourine Mountain Tennis Club
TSS (The Southport School)
Veterans Tennis Club

Taylor Byrne Tournaments

In the 2009 Taylor Byrne Head Junior Masters Tennis Circuit. The top two point scorers in every age group will represent the Gold Coast Region in the Queensland Junior Masters Final in Rockhampton on 24 & 25 October 2006. To be eligible to compete in the State Finals, a player must have played a minimum of five tournaments. There are five sections for boys and girls, 9/Under (round robin format), 11/Under, 13/Under, 15/Under, 17/Under.

Circuit Tournaments
15, 22 February 2009  Beenleigh Tennis Centre 
8, 15 March 2009  Hope Island Resort Tennis Centre
2, 3, 4 May 2009  Pro-One Tennis Academy
17, 24 May 2009  Miami Tennis Club 
12, 19 July 2009  Gold Coast Seniors Tennis Club
23, 30 August 2009  GCA Junior Tennis Club  
30 September/ 1, 2 October 2009  Queens Park Tennis Centre

N.b. the 9/Under section players do not participate in the Junior Master Finals.

References

External links
 Tennis Gold Coast

Gold
Sports governing bodies in Queensland
Tennis on the Gold Coast, Queensland